Acqua Limone is a clothing brand from Gothenburg in Sweden, founded in 1979 by Ilse Stålblad. Their products are mainly sports oriented. It was very common in Sweden for a period in the 1990s.

References

External links 
Official home page

Clothing brands
Clothing companies of Sweden
Companies based in Västra Götaland County